The Mon–Fayette Expressway is a partially-completed tolled freeway that is planned to eventually link Interstate 68 near Morgantown, West Virginia with Interstate 376 near Monroeville, Pennsylvania. The ultimate goal of the highway is to provide a high speed north–south connection between Morgantown and the eastern side of Pittsburgh while revitalizing economically distressed Monongahela River Valley towns in Fayette and Washington counties, serving as an alternative to Interstate 79 to the west, as well as relieving the PA 51 alignment from Pittsburgh to Uniontown.

Although it is being built to Interstate Highway standards, there is debate as to whether or not the freeway will become part of the Interstate Highway System. At least one proposal was to give it the Interstate 97 designation (unrelated to the existing I-97 in Maryland), while others have been to make it a spur route of I-68. In the interim, the highway uses state highway designations instead, as it does not parallel an existing U.S. Route for its entire length, though it does parallel and at times run concurrent with U.S. Route 40 and U.S. Route 119 for portions of its length. The route, in its three jurisdictions, uses the number 43 for familiarity, and is thus known as West Virginia Route 43 (WV 43), Pennsylvania Route 43 (PA 43), and PA Turnpike 43. Most of the route is maintained by the Pennsylvania Turnpike Commission, while the Pennsylvania Department of Transportation maintains small portions of the highway near Uniontown, and the West Virginia Division of Highways maintains the short section in West Virginia. Despite the numerous agencies overseeing the highway, it is one continuous highway.

South of Jefferson Hills, the Mon–Fayette Expressway is complete. Construction to complete the highway to Duquesne is scheduled to begin in 2022, with plans existing to extend the road further to Monroeville.

Route description

West Virginia

The Mon–Fayette Expressway begins at a diamond interchange with I-68 in Cheat Lake in Monongalia County, West Virginia, heading north as a four-lane freeway signed as WV 43. The highway passes near some residential development and comes to an interchange with Bowers Lane that provides access to County Route 857. Following this, WV 43 curves northeast and runs through forested areas, turning to the north.

Pennsylvania

The Mon–Fayette Expressway crosses the state line into Pennsylvania, where it becomes PA Turnpike 43, which is maintained by the Pennsylvania Turnpike Commission (PTC). The freeway heads through Springhill Township in Fayette County, passing through forested areas with some fields. The first interchange in the state is at Gans Road, which provides access to US 119 to the west and PA 857 to the east. 

Here, PA Turnpike 43 becomes a toll road and continues northeast through more rural areas, where it crosses into Georges Township and comes to a diamond interchange with Rubles Mill Road that accesses PA 857 a short distance to the east. Past this interchange, the highway comes to the Fairchance mainline toll plaza before it curves north and then northwest. The route passes to the west of an industrial park before reaching an interchange with Big Six Road which provides access to US 119 and PA 857.

At this point, the Mon–Fayette Expressway becomes toll-free and maintained by the Pennsylvania Department of Transportation (PennDOT), signed as PA 43. The roadway continues through farmland and woodland as it bypasses Fairchance to the west. Farther north, PA 43 comes to an interchange with US 119 and the northern terminus of PA 857, at which point the road becomes US 119. PA 43 continues as an unsigned concurrency with US 119 for  around Uniontown, with a sign saying that PA 43 traffic should follow signs for US 119 through Uniontown. A short distance later, US 119 and the unsigned PA 43 cross together into South Union Township and reach an interchange with the US 40 freeway, at which point US 40 merges with US 119 and the unsigned PA 43, joining the concurrency. The three routes bypass Uniontown to the west on the freeway, running between farmland and woods to the west and residential neighborhoods to the east. The highway comes to a diamond interchange with Walnut Hill Road, where it curves northwest and passes near more homes. US 40/US 119/unsigned PA 43 curves northeast and reaches a trumpet interchange providing access to PA 21 in a commercial area. A short distance later, the freeway comes to an interchange with the western terminus of US 40 Business, at which point US 40 splits to the northwest. US 119 and the unsigned PA 43 continue northeast on the freeway into North Union Township, where they run between rural areas to the northwest and residential areas to the southeast. The unsigned concurrency ends as PA Turnpike 43, again a toll road maintained by the PTC, splits from US 119 at an interchange that also serves PA 51.

The Mon–Fayette Expressway heads northwest through rural areas with some nearby development. The highway reaches a diamond interchange with Old Pittsburgh Road which provides connections to US 40 and PA 51. Past this interchange, the tollway crosses into Menallen Township and runs through a mix of farmland and woodland. Farther northwest, PA Turnpike 43 comes to an interchange at Keisterville-Upper Middletown Road, which provides access to US 40 to the southwest. The Mon–Fayette Expressway enters Redstone Township, where it reaches the Redstone mainline toll plaza. The highway continues northwest through rural land and comes to a diamond interchange with US 40. Following this, the toll road heads northwest through rural areas to the south of Brownsville, crossing the Dunlap Creek into Luzerne Township. Here, PA Turnpike 43 reaches the Telegraph Road exit and curves to the northwest.

The Mon–Fayette Expressway crosses the Monongahela River on the Mon–Fayette Expressway Bridge into Centerville in Washington County, where it curves north and comes to an interchange with PA 88. At this point, the road becomes toll-free again, though still owned by the PTC and signed PA Turnpike 43. PA 88 also joins the freeway for a short concurrency, with the road heading northeast through forested areas. The highway comes to a cloverleaf interchange with US 40, at which point PA 88 splits to the east to follow US 40 and PA Turnpike 43 continues northeast on the Mon–Fayette Expressway, entering California. The road continues through fields and woods, reaching an interchange with Malden Road that provides access to PA 88 Truck. The tollway continues north through dense woodland, bypassing the center of California to the west. The median widens as the highway comes to the exit for Elco Hill Road, after which it once again becomes a toll road. The median narrows again as PA Turnpike 43 curves northwest and comes to the California mainline toll plaza. A short distance later, the Mon–Fayette Expressway enters Fallowfield Township and comes to a cloverleaf interchange serving I-70.

Past this interchange, the toll road winds north through more woodland and reaches a diamond interchange at Coyle Curtain Road, which provides access to the communities of Charleroi and Donora to the east. PA Turnpike 43 heads into Carroll Township and makes a sharp curve to the west, continuing through more rural areas. The tollway curves north again near a mine and comes to the PA 136 exit. The Mon–Fayette Expressway crosses the Mingo Creek Viaduct into Union Township and continues north through wooded areas with some fields and mines. Farther north, the highway comes to a diamond interchange serving Finleyville-Elrama Road. Past this interchange, PA Turnpike 43 curves to the northeast. The tollway enters Jefferson Hills in Allegheny County, where it continues through more rural areas. The toll road reaches the Jefferson Hills mainline toll plaza and continues northeast, with the median widening and the road narrowing to one lane in each direction as it comes to a bridge over PA 51. The Mon–Fayette Expressway continues a short distance to its current northern terminus, where the traffic lanes turn west as Jefferson Boulevard and head to PA 51.

Tolls
The Mon–Fayette Expressway is a toll road for most of its length, and utilizes all-electronic tolling using toll-by-plate (which uses automatic license plate recognition to take a photo of the vehicle's license plate and mail a bill to the vehicle owner) or E-ZPass. Unlike the Pennsylvania Turnpike mainline and the Northeast Extension, which uses long-distance tickets, the Mon–Fayette Expressway collects fixed tolls at regular intervals. In addition, auxiliary toll plazas exist on certain on- and off-ramps. In 2008, the PTC retrofitted all toll plazas to accept E-ZPass, and Express E-ZPass lanes are available at the newer toll plazas. 

The Mon–Fayette Expressway has four mainline toll barriers located in Fairchance, Redstone, California, and Jefferson Hills. , the Fairchance and California barriers charge $4.40 using toll-by-plate and $1.80 using E-ZPass for passenger vehicles while the Redstone and Jefferson Hills barriers charge $5.30 using toll-by-plate and $2.70 using E-ZPass for passenger vehicles. There are also ramp toll plazas at the northbound exit and southbound entrances at exit 4, 15, and 18, the southbound exit and northbound entrance at exits 22 and 26, and the northbound exit and southbound entrance at exits 39, 44, and 48. The ramp tolls cost $3.20 using toll-by-plate and $1.40 using E-ZPass for passenger vehicles.

All-electronic tolling was planned to be implemented on the Mon–Fayette Expressway, along with the remainder of the Pennsylvania Turnpike system, in the later part of 2021. However, in March 2020 the switch was made early as a result of the COVID-19 pandemic.

In West Virginia, legislators have flip-flopped a few times regarding whether their section will be a toll road. When tolls were first proposed, West Virginia had planned to work with the Pennsylvania Turnpike Commission to collect tolls at the existing Pennsylvania mainline plaza, but this plan was not accepted by the West Virginia Legislature. Instead, West Virginia planned to construct a toll plaza north of Goodwin Hill Road.  West Virginia officials also contemplated whether to use all-electronic tolling or a more traditional tolling scheme. In the end, tolling plans were scrapped by West Virginia's legislature. Rejection resulted from concerns related to camera enforcement, billing, and operational costs. However, West Virginia reserves the right to levy tolls in the future if these issues are settled.

History

Early history
The Mon–Fayette Expressway was originally proposed in the 1950s as a way to link the coke- and steel-producing towns situated in the Monongahela River Valley, thus providing a supplement to existing rail and river passages.  Running along the existing PA Route 48, the highway was initially referred to as “New 48” and right-of-way clearance began in the early 1970s.   PennDOT initiated construction in 1973, and the first segment opened in 1977. This segment consisted of a partial cloverleaf interchange at U.S. Route 40 and a  stretch of four-lane highway that spurred south of the new interchange toward Fredericktown. Despite severe financial constraints, PennDOT built the remainder of the ramps at the U.S. 40 cloverleaf along with a separate  stretch of highway near California in the early 1980s.

Limited funding caused the project to be placed on hiatus in the early 1980s.  During this time, the coke and steel industry that originally inspired the route experienced an economic downturn and near collapse.  Rather than cancel the project, local leaders touted it as a means of stimulating the distressed economy; providing a link from the City of Pittsburgh to West Virginia along which manufacturing facilities and other industry could be located.  The project was redesignated as the Mon–Fayette Expressway, a portmanteau of  Monongahela River Valley and Fayette County, two of the areas the new road would connect.  The project was designed to be completed in phases with the most controversial segment, PA 51 to Pittsburgh, scheduled to be completed last.

Chadville Demonstration Project

In 1985, the Mon–Fayette Expressway project was transferred to the Pennsylvania Turnpike Commission (PTC) under Act 61 legislation. While PennDOT assessed preliminary engineering and right-of-way options in the 1970s and early 1980s, the PTC accelerated design work and began unveiling detailed plans in earnest by the late 1980s. Funding appropriated through the PTC allowed construction to resume in 1988, and on October 12, 1990, the entire stretch from U.S. Route 40 to Interstate 70 opened to traffic. Initially, the PTC did not have adequate funding to construct new sections, but Representative Austin Murphy secured congressional funds that directed PennDOT to build a  stretch of the expressway south of Uniontown. Aside from being part of a larger project, the new segment was designed to provide high speed access between the Uniontown bypass, Fairchance, and a new business park. This section, dubbed the Chadville Demonstration Project, opened in November 1992.

The section of the highway from US 40 to I-70 was signed PA 43 Toll until 2000.

Mason-Dixon Link

In the early 1990s, the Pennsylvania General Assembly dedicated a portion of state fuel excise tax revenue to the PTC. This new revenue stream initially provided the funding to complete an  section from the southern terminus of the Chadville Demonstration Project to the West Virginia state line as well as a  section from the Interstate 70 interchange to Pennsylvania Route 51 in Jefferson Hills.  On March 1, 2000, most of the section between the Chadville Demonstration Project and the West Virginia state line opened to traffic.

J. Barry Stout Expressway

Named formally for the PA State Senator who pushed to expand the state's highway system, the J. Barry Stout Expressway segment connects Interstate 70 with Route 51.  Construction began in 1995 and the entire segment from Interstate 70 to Route 51 was open by April 12, 2002. The Joe Montana Bridge, named after the Pro Football Hall of Fame quarterback who grew up in the immediate area in nearby Monongahela, Pennsylvania, is located along the route.

Uniontown-to-Brownsville

In 2006, construction began on a  stretch connecting the oldest section of the expressway near Fredericktown to the northern terminus of the Chadville Demonstration Project. Known locally as the "Uniontown-to-Brownsville Project," limited funding necessitated a two-phased approach to completion.  The first phase involved construction of an  section of expressway running parallel to a hazardous stretch of U.S. Route 40 between Brownsville and Uniontown. Phase 1 opened on October 23, 2008. The second phase consisted of a  section that connects first phase of this project to the oldest portion of the expressway near Fredericktown, as well as the Mon–Fayette Expressway Bridge crossing the Monongahela River. Additionally, the second phase includes a directional T interchange at U.S. Route 119 in Uniontown. On December 13, 2010, the U.S. 119 interchange opened to traffic, and the remainder of Phase 2 opened with a soft launch on July 16, 2012. A formal ribbon-cutting ceremony was held on August 2, 2012. Completion of Phase 2 brought an uninterrupted  stretch of highway between I-68 and the current northern terminus at Pennsylvania Route 51 in Jefferson Hills, Pennsylvania.

West Virginia Route 43

In West Virginia, construction commenced in 2000 but progressed slowly due to limited funding. Over the next few years, construction inched ahead. By 2009, the Morgan Run Bridge was finished, and local roads near Cheat Lake were re-built to accommodate the expressway. The final contracts to build the Cheat Lake and Interstate 68 interchanges were respectively awarded in December 2008 and July 2009, partly as a result of an ARRA fund infusion. On July 11, 2011, officials in West Virginia opened their  section of the Mon–Fayette Expressway. Likewise, the PTC opened the southernmost  in Pennsylvania, which sat unused for over a decade. Noteworthy features on the West Virginia section include two high-level bridges, along with the I-68 interchange, which is a hybrid design that utilizes both high-speed ramps and at-grade intersections. A second phase for this interchange is planned, but that project will not be undertaken until traffic volumes merit. If the second phase is built, the I-68 interchange will be upgraded to a directional T.

Future
The remaining  of highway in Allegheny County between PA 51 and I-376 has yet to be constructed. After a review of several alternative alignments designated by colors (green, yellow, orange, and blue), a series of public meetings hosted by the Pennsylvania Turnpike Commission sought feedback from residents likely affected by the expressway's construction. The preferred route was identified as running parallel to PA 837 through the communities of Clairton and Duquesne, crossing over the Monongahela River near Kennywood Park, and then continuing along the northern side of the river through Braddock, Rankin, and Glen Hazel, finally connecting to I-376 at Oakland. A western spur would be located near the crossing and continue north through Turtle Creek and Monroeville to I-376 in Wilkins. The addition of the spur allows for an alternative to I-376 that would bypass the often congested Squirrel Hill Tunnel.

After environmental clearances were obtained and right-of-way acquisition had begun, the project was placed on hold due to lack of funding.  Current estimates for this section are in the neighborhood of $3.6 billion and funding has not been identified. A public-private partnership was explored but nothing feasible resulted. It is unlikely that any new construction will commence in the near future unless a new tax is imposed or private funding identified, although funding was secured for the section of PA Turnpike 576 in between Interstate 79 and its current eastern terminus at US 22, bringing hope for an eventual completion of the Mon–Fayette Expressway.

In July 2013, the Allegheny County portion of the expressway was again the subject of news articles indicating that a change in approach may be taken.  This revised approach would allow for completion of the expressway to Monroeville.  The spur to Pittsburgh would not be constructed but rather the East Busway would be extended to Monroeville to allow for park and ride into downtown Pittsburgh.  Another option currently being considered is to open the Busway to high-occupancy vehicle (HOV) traffic.

In May 2013, a raise in the oil tax cap in Pennsylvania was proposed in the Pennsylvania General Assembly to fund additional transportation projects, including completing the Mon–Fayette Expressway and the Southern Beltway, as part of a larger transportation bill to help fund projects in the state. Pennsylvania Governor Tom Corbett signed a modified version of the bill into law, known as Act 89, on November 25, 2013, after much debate in the General Assembly that nearly killed the bill before it was passed. Act 89, which local politicians acknowledged that without passage would have killed the remaining segments of the Mon–Fayette Expressway, is expected to provide funding to complete the Southern Beltway all the way to the Mon–Fayette Expressway and provide a little less than half of the $2.2 billion (as of December 2013) needed to complete the Mon–Fayette Expressway, as well as the option for P3 funding. It was also acknowledged that like the Uniontown-to-Brownsville Project, the final leg may be built in multiple phases in order to preserve funding for other projects in the state. The second leg of the Southern Beltway, which will proceed in construction as had already been announced, will be the first portion of the two highways that will be built with the new funding available, with a planned opening to I-79 in 2019.

In December 2014, it was reported that the Mon–Fayette Expressway and the Southern Beltway might get additional funding through foreign investors who obtain an EB-5 visa in exchange for investing at least $500,000 for public projects. The Pennsylvania Turnpike Commission will use EB-5 funding for the Pennsylvania Turnpike/Interstate 95 Interchange Project first before determining if it will use such funding for other projects.

On June 18, 2015, the PTC announced that the segment for the Mon–Fayette Expressway from Jefferson Hills to Monroeville will receive some Act 89 funding and will return to the design phase. The other leg of the Mon–Fayette Expressway into Pittsburgh was officially canceled outright, citing cost and local opposition. It is currently unclear whether this road will be designated PA Turnpike 43 or PA Turnpike 576.

In March 2018, the PTC released its plans for the expressway from PA 51 in Jefferson Hills to PA 837 in Duquesne. This section is currently in the final design phase , with construction expected to begin in 2024. Construction on the section of the expressway between PA 837 in Duquesne and I-376 in Monroeville is expected to follow, but may be delayed due to funding shortfalls resulting from the COVID-19 pandemic.

In May 2019 a proposal was made for an expressway to run from the Mon–Fayette Expressway to PA 885 near the Glenwood Bridge. In March 2021, a PTC engineer said that preliminary work on the Mon–Fayette Expressway from Jefferson Hills to PA 837 would begin after the projected completion of the Southern Beltway later that year. The PTC was in the process of acquiring 256 land lots in the Mon–Fayette Expressway's right-of-way, including condemning some land in West Mifflin, Pennsylvania, that belonged to Kennywood amusement park. In June 2021, PTC officials told Pennsylvania state legislators that construction on the section to Duquesne could begin as early as 2022. The first construction contract to build the section between PA 51 and Coal Valley Road in Jefferson Hills is expected to be awarded by the end of 2022 while construction on the portion of road from Coal Valley Road to Camp Hollow Road in West Mifflin is expected to begin in 2023. Work on the segment to Duquesne was projected to continue through 2027.

Exit list

Related roads
In the 1990s, the Mon–Fayette Expressway project was expanded to include another highway, the Southern Beltway. The Southern Beltway is planned to be a high-speed east–west link between the Mon–Fayette Expressway, Interstate 79, U.S. Route 22, Interstate 376, and Pittsburgh International Airport. A  section of the beltway between Pittsburgh International Airport/Interstate 376 and U.S. Route 22 opened to traffic in 2006.  The new road has been designated as Pennsylvania Route 576. A  section between U.S. 22 and I-79 is expected to be open by 2021, with the third section being between I-79 and a section of the Mon–Fayette Expressway near Finleyville, Pennsylvania just south of the current northern terminus.

In order to provide access to certain interchanges within the Uniontown-to-Brownsville project, the PTC had to build several toll-free connectors, the most notable of which extended a four-lane section of U.S. Route 40 near Brownsville, eliminating a forty-year-old freeway stub in the process. Near Uniontown, the PTC constructed a four-lane road, named Northgate Highway, between U.S. Route 40 and Pennsylvania Route 51. In addition, a new connector was added to join Telegraph Road and Bull Run Road in Luzerne Township, potentially opening many acres of land to future development. The aforementioned access roads were necessary to provide access to exits 22, 15, and 26 respectively, but these routes were also designed to improve local connections and accommodate any future economic development in the interchanges' immediate vicinity.

See also

References

External links

Pennsylvania Highways: PA 43
Pennsylvania Highways: PA Turnpike 43
Interstate 79 to Mon/Fayette Expressway Pennsylvania Turnpike Commission
 (May 10, 2006)
Mon/Fayette Expressway, Uniontown to Brownsville Project
PA Route 51 to I-376 of the Mon Fayette Expressway

Toll roads in Pennsylvania
Limited-access roads in Pennsylvania
Transportation in Allegheny County, Pennsylvania
Transportation in Washington County, Pennsylvania
Transportation in Fayette County, Pennsylvania
Transportation in Monongalia County, West Virginia
Pennsylvania Turnpike Commission